Valeri Vikentyevich Minko (born 8 August 1971) is a former association footballer who played defender and now head coach.

He capped for USSR U-20 team at 1991 FIFA World Youth Championship.

In 1993, he was subjected to nephrectomy after being injured when playing a 1994 U-21 European Championship qualifying game against Greece (1–1). Nevertheless, he decided to continue his career with one kidney remaining and played over 200 games after his injury. Now he is considered by CSKA fans as one of symbols of courage and team spirit.

External links
 
 Valery Minko's 1999 interview 
 

1971 births
Living people
Sportspeople from Barnaul
Soviet footballers
Soviet Union youth international footballers
Soviet Union under-21 international footballers
Russian footballers
Russia under-21 international footballers
Russia international footballers
Russian football managers
FC Dynamo Barnaul players
PFC CSKA Moscow players
Soviet Top League players
Russian Premier League players
FC Kuban Krasnodar players
Association football defenders